The  (SQ;) is the provincial police service for the Canadian province of Quebec. No official English name exists; the agency's name is sometimes translated to Quebec Provincial Police (QPP) in English-language sources. The SQ is the second-largest provincial police service (behind the Ontario Provincial Police) and the fourth-largest police service in Canada (behind the Royal Canadian Mounted Police, the Toronto Police Service and the Ontario Provincial Police).

Function
The primary function of the Sûreté du Québec (SQ) is to enforce provincial laws, some municipal bylaws, the Criminal Code and many other laws throughout Quebec, and to assist municipal police services when needed.

At the local level, the SQ is responsible for providing local police services to municipalities that chose not to have their own police department (mostly localities with populations under 50,000), in exchange for payment relative to their size. In other cities, the Sûreté du Québec can also take over criminal investigations from municipal police services when required by the Police Act of the province, according to the severity of the crime and the size of the population (e.g., the SQ will take in charge any homicide with no imminent arrests in a city of less than 250,000, even if it has its own police department). The SQ is usually present in smaller, rural or suburban communities, and it is not usually visible on the streets of large urban centres like Montreal and Quebec City, whose own police departments must provide a wide range of services and operations by law. In those cities, however, the SQ still has large offices where various investigations are conducted.

At the provincial level, the SQ is responsible for actions such as patrolling the highways of Quebec, preserving the integrity of governmental institutions, coordinating large-scale investigations (such as during the biker war in the 1990s), and maintaining and sharing the criminal intelligence database of Quebec with other services. In addition, the SQ can provide technical assistance to Quebec's independent investigation unit (BEI) in any incident involving possible wrongdoing by another police department, such as deaths and serious injuries. Should the SQ be involved in such an incident, assistance (if needed) will be provided either by the police service of Montreal or of Quebec City.

History
On February 1, 1870, the Quebec provincial government created the Police provinciale du Québec under the direction of its first commissioner, Judge Pierre-Antoine Doucet. This new service took over the headquarters of the Quebec City municipal police, which were then disbanded, although the city relaunched a municipal service in 1877.

In 1900, two distinct provincial police services were created: the Office of Provincial Detectives of Montreal, in response to a crime wave in that city, and the Revenue Police, whose mission was to collect taxes. In 1902, the government decided that the provincial police should no longer be directed by a judge but by an officer of the police themselves. Augustin McCarthy was chosen as the first chief drawn from the ranks of the police.

In 1922, two headquarters were established, one in Quebec City, headed by McCarthy, and one in Montreal, headed by Dieudonné Daniel Lorrain. The Office of Provincial Detectives of Montreal became part of the general provincial police in that year. The Quebec division included 35 police officers and two detectives.
In 1925, police officers started patrolling on motorcycles. In 1929 and 1930, the structure of the service was reformed and the agency adopted a new name as  Sûreté provinciale du Québec which was later shortened to its present name.

Oka Crisis

A significant local, provincial, national and First Nations crisis erupted in 1990 after SQ officers attempted to enforce a court order on the Mohawks of Oka, Quebec. SQ Corporal  Marcel Lemay was killed by gunfire in the initial raid (likely by friendly-fire), and a 77 day standoff ensued.  For a more thorough review, see Oka Crisis.

Montebello incident

The Sûreté du Québec admitted in August 2007 that they had used undercover police posing as protestors at the 2007 Montebello Security and Prosperity Partnership of North America meetings. This admission was made after a video captured by protestors was widely circulated in the Canadian media and made available on YouTube. The video appeared to show one of the officers carrying a rock, suggesting that the police may have been acting as inciting agents by inciting violence.

Chiefs and directors-general

Districts

 Bas-Saint-Laurent-Gaspésie-Îles-de-la-Madeleine
 Saguenay-Lac-Saint-Jean
 Capitale-Nationale-Chaudière-Appalaches
 Mauricie-Centre-du-Québec
 Estrie
 Montréal-Laval-Laurentides-Lanaudière
 Outaouais
 Abitibi-Témiscamingue-Nord-du-Québec
 Côte-Nord
 Montérégie

Rank badges
Rank insignia of the Sûreté du Québec are on contained on slip-on sleeves, worn on the epaulettes of uniform jacket or shirt shoulders.

Constables (Agent) do not have any insignia on their uniform. The SQ formerly had the rank of Corporal above Constable rank. Team leaders have an epaulette with the words Chef d'équipe.

Uniforms
Early uniforms were British in origin, including the use of the custodian helmet, with the kepi later added as well. The service adopted a uniform with a more distinct green tone, as well as a peaked cap, in the 1960s.

The emblem of the service changed in the 1970s, when the old provincial coat of arms gave way to the fleur-de-lis.

In late 2016, Martin Prud'Homme, Director General of the SQ, announced the uniforms would be changed. Shirts and coats will be of a darker shade of olive green; patches, caps, and bulletproof vests will become black, and pants blue-black. One of the justifications for the changes was that the old green uniform was too similar to that of a soldier's.

Fleet
Beginning progressively in 2017, marked patrol cars are set to become black with white doors, on which the word "POLICE" will be more evident.

Cars:
 Chevrolet Impala
 Chevrolet Tahoe
 Dodge Charger 
 Ford Police Interceptor Utility
 Ford Taurus

Trucks:
 Dodge Dakota
 Ford E-250
 Ford F-350
 Ford F-450
 Ram 2500 pickup

Motorcycles:
 BMW police motorcycle
 Mikado bicycles

Special Vehicles:
 Prevost Car Command Post
 Hummer H1 armoured truck
 International 7500 support vehicle
 APC
 Cambli International Thunder 1 ARV (with International 7500 chassis)

Air:
 Bell 206
 Bell 206 LT
 Bell 412

Sea:
 Doral patrol boat
 Bombardier Sea-doo

Wild:
 Bombardier Ski-doo snowmobile
 Grizzly ATV

Equipment

The standard-issue weapon of the SQ is the Glock pistol, loaded in 9×19mm Parabellum caliber. Various models have been adopted, such as the standard Glock 17 Gen 3, compact Glock 19, and sub-compact Glock 26. Tactical officers used the C8CQB Close Quarter Battle combat rifle, a variant of the Colt Canada C8 rifle.

Prior to the Glock pistols, officers carried .357 Magnum revolvers, which were replaced with the Glock 17 in 2001.

Licence Plate Recognition System

The SQ has been using the LPRS systems since 2009. The objective of the LPRS is to make the streets and highways safer by removing vehicles not authorized to be on the road. The hotlist plate database can consist of the following types:
 unregistered plate (not paid at DMV/SAAQ)
 stolen vehicles
 AMBER Alert
 wanted vehicles

The LPRS are installed on 10 Sûreté du Québec vehicles. The LPRS integrator is Gtechna. Gtechna is primarily a citations issuance and management software developer which integrates mission critical technologies such as Licence Plate Recognition (LPR) to streamline the enforcement of moving and parking violations.

In popular culture
The Sûreté du Québec has become well known internationally through the fictional Chief Inspector Armand Gamache and his colleagues, created by Canadian author Louise Penny, who lives in Quebec. Penny's works have been recognized in Quebec by her being made a Member of the Order of Quebec.

The Three Pines series on Amazon Prime Video, inspired by the books, also includes characters who are police officers with the Sûreté du Québec, including Gamache.

See also
 Service de police de la Ville de Montréal
 State police
 Ontario Provincial Police
 Royal Newfoundland Constabulary
 Newfoundland Rangers
 Royal Canadian Mounted Police

Notes

References

External links

 
 

Government agencies established in 1870
Law enforcement agencies of Quebec
Organizations based in Montreal
1870 establishments in Quebec
Protective security units
Canadian provincial police